I, Superbiker (or I Superbiker) is a 2011 British film documentary directed by film maker and biker Mark Sloper. Inspired by the David Essex film Silver Dream Racer, the film focuses on four contenders for the 2010 British Superbike Championship: Tommy Hill, James Ellison, Josh Brookes and Gary Mason. The film score was written and recorded by David Vanian David Vanian, the frontman of the punk and alternative rock band The Damned. The title track 'I, Superbiker' was written by  Phil Collen of  Def Leppard with his band Manraze which also features drummer  Paul Cook of the Sex Pistols.

I Superbiker was released in UK cinemas in 2011.

References

External links 
 Official movie website
 

Motorcycle racing films
British auto racing films
Documentary films about auto racing
2010s English-language films
British sports documentary films
2010s British films